Shankarrao Devram Kale (1921-2012) was an Indian politician and an important figure in the Sahakar chalval co-operative movement in Maharashtra's Ahmednagar district. He was a State Minister in the Cabinet of the then Chief Minister of Maharashtra, Sharad Pawar. He also represented the Kopargaon Loksabha constituency from 1991 to 1996 for the Indian National Congress.

He worked for the welfare of farmers and workers. Ganpatrao Autade established Kopargaon Sahakari Sakhar Karkhana Ltd in 1953 at Kolpewadi, Ahmednagar district, Maharashtra. Shri Kale was one of the founding board of directors. He took the cooperative movement to the top in Ahmednagar district and Maharashtra state as well.

He died on 5 November 2012.

See also

 Ashutosh Ashokrao Kale

References

External links
 MLA Ashutosh Kale 
 Karmaveer Shankarrao Kale Cooperative Sugar factory 

Indian National Congress politicians from Maharashtra
People from Ahmednagar district
Lok Sabha members from Maharashtra
1921 births
Maharashtra politicians
Marathi people
2012 deaths
India MPs 1991–1996